Higher-Order Perl: Transforming Programs with Programs, is a book about the Perl programming language written by Mark Jason Dominus with the goal to teach Perl programmers with a strong C and Unix background how to use techniques with roots in functional programming languages like Lisp that are available in Perl as well.

In June 2013, a Chinese-language edition was published by China Machine Press.  The full text of Higher Order Perl is available online in a variation of the Plain Old Documentation format (MOD) and in PDF.

Reception 
The book has received reviews from sources including ACM Computing Reviews, Linux Journal, Weblabor, Dr. Dobb's Journal, and The Prague Bulletin of Mathematical Linguistics.

References

External links 
 

Books about Perl
2005 books